AC Express trains are fully air-conditioned Superfast Express trains linking major cities in India. They have high priority and are among the fastest trains in India. Though some trains travel at 130 km/h at some sections, most of them are restricted to a speed of 110 km/h. The food is not free in these trains but the bedroll is free for passengers who are traveling by AC Express. The charges of these trains are cheaper than Rajdhani Express, Duronto Express and Humsafar Express also (except Chennai–Thiruvananthapuram AC Superfast Express – with Rajdhani type fare). Some of the AC Express trains have pantry cars for required passengers. The first AC train Nanda Devi AC Express ran on 1 July 2008 with the maximum speed of 125 kmph. Madurai - Bikaner Anuvrat AC Superfast Express is the longest running AC Superfast Express of Indian Railways covering total distance of around 3065 kilometres.

Routes
The following AC Express Trains have been operated:

See also